The Oregon Forest Resources Institute (OFRI) is a publicly-funded forestry trade organization. It operates as the timber industry's de facto lobbying organization in Oregon and has advocated against climate change research.

History
OFRI was created by the Oregon Legislative Assembly in 1991 and is funded by a dedicated forest-products harvest tax. Its Board of Directors consists entirely of representatives from the timber industry.

Its forestry education programs reach more than 100,000 students and more than 1,000 educators annually. Slanted against concerns about the environment, clean drinking water, and global warming, its Oregon Forest Literacy Program includes a forest education conceptual framework correlated with state education standards that offer educators guidance for developing industry-friendly classroom lessons related to forests.

OFRI manages the Rediscovery Forest, a forested area used for educational purposes and to demonstrate diverse Oregon wildlife habitat and forest ecosystems. The Rediscovery Forest is located in the Oregon Garden, in Silverton.

OFRI has purchased several prominent advertising campaigns in the state of Oregon benefiting the timber industry.  These campaigns are paid for with taxpayer dollars. In 2015 OFRI spent $1.05 million in taxpayer funds.

Lobbying
A 2020 investigation by Oregon Public Broadcasting (OPB) and The Oregonian revealed that OFRI has acted as "public-relations agency and lobbying arm for Oregon's timber industry." The reporting showed that OFRI promotes the timber industry and suppresses dissemination of legitimate research conducted by reputable scientists including Beverly Law, a professor at Oregon State University.

On August 31, 2020, Gov. Kate Brown requested an audit of OFRI as a result of OPB's investigation. OFRI had not been audited since 1996. Secretary of State Bev Clarno will be conducting the audit. In June 2021, the state house voted to cut the majority of its funding HB 2357 B, reducing it to $1.7 million from a $4 million annual budget. The bill has been sent to the senate.

The audit was completed by July 2021, finding breaches of authority and "reasonably raise the question" that OFRI broke the law. OFRI's director, Erin Isselmann, agreed to change its practices.

See also
List of Oregon state forests

References

External links
 

1991 establishments in Oregon
Forest research institutes
Forestry in the United States
Research institutes in Oregon
Forest Resources